Marcos Ligato (born 22 November 1977) is an Argentine rally driver.

Career
In the 1998 Rally Argentina he finished 14th overall and 3rd in PWRC.

He has raced in classes like JWRC in 2003 and the PWRC from 1998-2012 as well as the IRC. In 2016, Ligato scored his first-ever WRC points at Rally Argentina in his first event in the Citroën DS3 WRC.

Career results

WRC results

References

External links
 WRC Results (eWRC)

Argentine rally drivers
1977 births
World Rally Championship drivers
Living people
Citroën Racing drivers